Paas may refer to:

People with the surname
 David Paas (born 1971), Belgian football player
 John Paas, also spelled John Pass (engraver)
 René Paas (born 1966), Dutch politician

Places
 Paas, Java (nl), village in Pameungpeuk, Indonesia

Other
 Paas (dye), brand of Easter egg dye
 Payments as a service
 Platform as a service, cloud computing service